Zipline Safari is a zip-line course in Florida. It is the only zip-line course in the state, and is claimed to be the world's only zip-line created for flat land. Zipline Safari opened on 16 January 2009 in Forever Florida, a wildlife attraction near Holopaw, Florida. The zip-line cost $350,000 to build, and consists of nine platforms built up from the ground and traveled between by zip-lining. Forever Florida built the course to promote ecotourism and interaction with the natural environment of Florida.

References

Zip lines
Buildings and structures in Osceola County, Florida
Tourist attractions in Osceola County, Florida